Thomas Fortescue (1683 – 23 January 1769) was an Irish Member of Parliament.

Origins
He was descended from Sir Faithful Fortescue (c.1581–1666), a royalist commander during the English Civil War, a member of the Fortescue family of Buckland Filleigh in Devon, descended from Sir John Fortescue (c.1394-1479), Chief Justice of the King's Bench, of Ebrington Manor, Gloucestershire, a younger grandson of the Fortescue family of Whympston in the parish of Modbury in Devon, the earliest Fortescue seat in England.

Career
He sat in the Irish House of Commons for Dundalk from 1727 to 1760.

Marriage and children
He married Elizabeth Hamilton, a daughter of James Hamilton, a sister of James Hamilton, 1st Earl of Clanbrassil and a granddaughter of John Mordaunt, 1st Viscount Mordaunt, by whom he had children including:
William Henry Fortescue, 1st Earl of Clermont; 
James Fortescue, an MP and Privy Councillor; 
Charlotte Fortescue, who married Sir Henry Goodricke, 6th Baronet;
Margaret Fortescue, who married Sir Arthur Brooke, 1st Baronet.

Further reading
Clermont, Lord  (d.1887),  History of the Family of Fortescue in all its Branches, London, 1880

References

 http://thepeerage.com/p18069.htm#i180688
 

1683 births
1769 deaths
Irish MPs 1727–1760
Thomas
Members of the Parliament of Ireland (pre-1801) for County Louth constituencies